Gnorimoschema compsomorpha is a moth in the family Gelechiidae. It was described by Edward Meyrick in 1929. It is found in the US state of New Mexico.

References

Gnorimoschema
Moths described in 1929